Craig Walton (born 10 October 1975 in Ulverstone, Tasmania) is an Australian triathlete.

Walton competed in the triathlon at the 2000 Summer Olympics.  He took twenty-seventh place with a total time of 1:50:57.66.
Walton was a powerful swimmer and strong cyclist. He typically established a large lead coming into the run leg but was frequently caught by faster runners before the finish.
He enjoyed significantly more success in non-drafting events such as Noosa triathlon, which he won 7 times and for which he holds the course record.
Walton was coach to Emma Moffatt and to his longtime partner, Emma Snowsill.

External links
Craig Walton at sports-reference.com
 http://www.ironman.com/triathlon/events/asiapac/multisports/noosa/results/honour-roll.aspx#axzz2mA6vR4SP
 http://www.mysunshinecoast.com.au/articles/article-display/champion-triathlete-craig-walton-announces-noosa-comeback,18698#.UppJyX8ayK0

1975 births
Living people
Australian male triathletes
Olympic triathletes of Australia
Triathletes at the 2000 Summer Olympics
People from Ulverstone, Tasmania
Royal Society of Queensland
20th-century Australian people
21st-century Australian people